Allium flavidum is an Asian species of onions native to Xinjiang, Altay Krai, Mongolia and Kazakhstan. It grows in rocky areas.

Allium flavidum has narrow bulbs up to 1 cm in diameter. Scapes are up to 45 cm long, round in cross-section. Leaves are very narrow, shorter than the scape. Umbel is large and spherical with many white or pale yellow flowers.

References

flavidum
Onions
Flora of temperate Asia
Plants described in 1830